The Journal of Chemical Information and Modeling is a peer-reviewed scientific journal published by the American Chemical Society. It was established in 1961 as the Journal of Chemical Documentation, renamed in 1975 to Journal of Chemical Information and Computer Sciences, and obtained its current name in 2005. The journal covers the fields of computational chemistry and chemical informatics. The editor-in-chief is Kenneth M. Merz Jr. (Michigan State University). The journal supports Open Science approaches.

Abstracting and indexing 
The journal is abstracted and indexed in:
 Chemical Abstracts Service
 Scopus
 ProQuest databases
 Science Citation Index
 Current Contents/Physical, Chemical & Earth Sciences
 Index Medicus/MEDLINE/PubMed.

References

External links 

 

Computer science journals
Cheminformatics
Computational chemistry
American Chemical Society academic journals
Monthly journals
English-language journals
Publications established in 1961